{{Automatic taxobox
| fossil_range = Mid-Late Triassic~
| image = Dinodontosaurus_skeleton_UFRGS.jpg
| image_caption = Mounted Dinodontosaurus skeleton
| taxon = Dinodontosaurus
| authority = Romer, 1943
| type_species = Dinodontosaurus tener
| type_species_authority = (Huene, 1935 [originally Dicynodon])
| subdivision_ranks = Species
| subdivision =
 D. brevirostris 
 D. tener
 D. turpior 
| synonyms = 

{{collapsible list|bullets = true
 |title = Species Synonymy
 | <small>D. brevirostris:</small>
  
| <small>D. tener:</small>
  
}}
| synonyms_ref = 
}}Dinodontosaurus (meaning "terrible-toothed lizard") is a genus of dicynodont therapsid. It lived in the Middle Triassic but disappeared in the Upper Triassic.

Species 
 Dinodontosaurus tener is the most common species of dicynodont that existed in the Middle Triassic, and more common in the fossil layers that age in Rio Grande do Sul, in Rota Paleontológica. They are found mainly in the Paleontological Site Chiniquá in São Pedro do Sul  and Candelária, where a group of ten pups were found together, demonstrating that these animals had strategies for coexistence in a group and caring for their offspring. Diodontosaurus pedroanum Tupi-Caldas, 1936 and Dinodontosaurus oliveirai, Romer 1943 are synonyms.
 Dinodontosaurus brevirostris is known from remains found in Argentina. Chanaria platyceps Cox, 1968 and Dinodontosaurus platygnathus are synonyms.

Gallery

References 

Anomodont genera
Kannemeyeriiformes
Middle Triassic synapsids of South America
Middle Triassic first appearances
Late Triassic extinctions
Late Triassic synapsids of South America
Triassic Argentina
Fossils of Argentina
Paraná Basin
Santa Maria Formation
Triassic Brazil
Fossils of Brazil
Fossil taxa described in 1943
Taxa named by Alfred Romer